Lin Liang-chung, credited as Jong Lin, is a Taiwanese-born cinematographer. Best known for his work on many of director Ang Lee's early films, Lin has gone on to serve as director of photographer with some of Mainland China's most important directors, and has also gone abroad, where he served as the cinematographer for Gurinder Chadha in the British film Bend It Like Beckham. He is sometimes credited as "Josh Lin".

Filmography

References

External links 

Living people
Taiwanese cinematographers
Year of birth missing (living people)